The Sarasaviya Most Popular Actor Award is presented annually by the weekly Sarasaviya newspaper in collaboration with the Associated Newspapers of Ceylon Limited at the Sarasaviya Awards Festival. This award is decided solely on  popular vote and is chosen based on the verdict given by the readers of the weekly Sarasaviya. Although the Sarasaviya Awards Ceremony began in 1964, this award was introduced two years later, in 1966. 
Gamini Fonseka was chosen as the most popular actor,  that year.
During the two decades from 1962 to 1982 Gamini Fonseka managed to retain this title marking the period from Ranmuthuduwa in 1962 to Sakvithi Suvaya in 1982 most appropriately as the Gamini Fonseka era.
In the aftermath of 1983 for full five years continuously, the actor-turned politician, the late Vijaya Kumaratunga held the position of the most popular actor which devolved on Sanath Gunatilake, Jeevan Kumaratunga, and Ranjan Ramanayake successively after his demise.

Following is a list of the winners of this prestigious title since 1966.

Popular Actor
Awards established in 1966